KRBT (1340 AM) is a radio station broadcasting a sports format. Licensed to Eveleth, Minnesota, United States, the station serves the Iron Range area. The station is owned by Range Broadcasting, Inc., and features programming from the KFAN Radio Network. Originally a stand-alone music station with call letters WEVE, then a simulcast music station with WEVE-FM, the station changed its call letters to KRBT for "Range's Best Talk" in June 1998 and discontinued simulcast with WEVE-FM to become a talk station. The format change to sports-talk was made following the death of the previous owner, Lew Latto, Iron Range Broadcasting, Inc. president, on August 24, 2011, and the subsequent sale to Red Rock Radio in March 2012, and has been retained by the new owner as of July 2017, Range Broadcasting, Inc.

While including local sports programming, local church programming and a Finnish language music show (Sunday morning), they also carry the Minnesota Twins, Minnesota Vikings, and Minnesota Wild and have introduced local live remote broadcasts from various charitable and community interest events as part of a "Local Broadcasting" initiative to return the station back to its former, locally owned, locally operated status and distinguish it from the large, multi-station ownership groups that dominate much of the country's radio landscape.

References

External links
FCC History Cards for KRBT

Radio stations in Minnesota
Sports radio stations in the United States
Radio stations established in 1948